The 1926–27 season was Manchester City F.C.'s thirty-sixth season of league football and first season back in the Football League Second Division since the 1909–10 season, and the first time they had been in the Second Division without achieving promotion since 1898.

Football League Second Division

Results summary

Reports

FA Cup

Squad statistics

Squad
Appearances for competitive matches only

Scorers

See also
Manchester City F.C. seasons

References

External links
Extensive Manchester City statistics site

Manchester City F.C. seasons
Manchester City F.C.